Rao River, also known as Po River, Du River, Changgang River and Fan River, is a river in northeastern Jiangxi, China. Rao River has two tributaries, the Chang River in the north and the Le'an River in the south. The two tributaries meet in Yaogong Ferry in southeastern Poyang County to join Rao River.

History

References

Rivers of Jiangxi
Poyang County
Wuyuan County, Jiangxi